Novokhalilovo (Yañı Xälil) is a rural locality (a village) in Mesyagutovsky Selsoviet Duvansky District, Bashkortostan, Russia. The population was 156 as of 2010. There are 3 streets.

Geography 
Novokhalilovo is located 10 km east of Mesyagutovo (the district's administrative centre) by road. Mesyagutovo is the nearest rural locality.

References 

Rural localities in Duvansky District